Christopher Hector (born 1968) is a British former sports shooter.

Sports shooting career
Hector has won twelve Commonwealth Games medals spanning five Games from 1990 until 2006.

The success began when he represented England and won two silver medals in the individual air rifle and air rifle pairs with Robert Smith, at the 1990 Commonwealth Games in Auckland, New Zealand. Four years later, at his second Games in Victoria, British Columbia, he won a medal of each colour; a gold in the air rifle, a silver in the air rifle pair with Nigel Wallace and a bronze medal in the 50 metres smallbore rifle 3 position pairs with Trevor Langridge. At the 1998 Commonwealth Games in Kuala Lumpur he won three more medals; double gold in the air rifle events (the pair with Nigel Wallace) and a bronze in the rifle 3 position pairs with Kenneth Parr.

His fourth Games in 2002 in his home nation provided two medals, a silver in the rifle 3 position pair with Jason Burrage and a bronze, once again with Wallace in the air rifle pair. A remarkable Commonwealth Games career came to an end after the 2006 Games which saw him win his 11th and 12th medals, a gold in the 50 metres prone with Michael Babb and a bronze in the rifle 3 positions with Burrage.

References

1968 births
Living people
British male sport shooters
Shooters at the 1990 Commonwealth Games
Shooters at the 1994 Commonwealth Games
Shooters at the 1998 Commonwealth Games
Shooters at the 2002 Commonwealth Games
Shooters at the 2006 Commonwealth Games
Shooters at the 2010 Commonwealth Games
Commonwealth Games medallists in shooting
Commonwealth Games gold medallists for England
Commonwealth Games silver medallists for England
Commonwealth Games bronze medallists for England
Medallists at the 1990 Commonwealth Games
Medallists at the 1994 Commonwealth Games
Medallists at the 1998 Commonwealth Games
Medallists at the 2002 Commonwealth Games
Medallists at the 2006 Commonwealth Games